United Nations Slavery Memorial, officially known as The Permanent Memorial at the United Nations in Honour of the Victims of Slavery and the Transatlantic Slave Trade, is an installation at the Headquarters of the United Nations in New York City intended as a permanent reminder of the long-lasting effects of slavery and the slave trade.

The Slavery Memorial concept came from various resolutions adopted by the UN General Assembly including A/RES/62/122, A/RES/63/5, and the Durban Declaration.

The memorial was designed by Haitian-American architect Rodney Leon, and unveiled on March 25, 2015.  It includes three main elements: a large triangular sculpture with a map depicting the triangular slave trade; a prone human figure depicting those who were transported overseas enslaved; and a reflecting pool mean to honour the memory of those who died in slavery.  The project was supported by the Permanent Memorial Trust Fund; the estimated cost of the project prior to its construction was 4.5 million dollars.

Advisory board
Goodwill ambassadors: Russell Simmons (entrepreneur, philanthropist)
Chair: Mr. Howard Dodson (Schomburg Center for Research in Black Culture)
 Cheik Diarra (Microsoft Middle East and Africa)
 Ellen Haddigan (Diamond Empowerment Fund)
 David Scheider (The Coca-Cola Company)
 Harriet Mouchly-Weiss (Kreab Gavin ANderson)
 Joseph Daniel (National September 11 Memorial & Museum at the World Trade Center)
 David Dinkins (School of International Public Affairs)
 Peter Tichansky (Business Council for International Understanding)
 Luis Ubinas (Ford Foundation)
 Congressman Gregory W. Meeks
 Javier Evans (senior premier corporate and professionals relationship manager, HSBC)

Partners
 CARICOM 
 United Nations Office for Partnerships
 Jamaica Mission
 African Union

See also
 United Nations Art Collection

References

External links
 

Monuments and memorials to victims of slavery in the United States
Monuments and memorials in Manhattan
2012 sculptures
Slavery memorials
2015 establishments in New York City
Slavery in art